Senegal's first President, Léopold Senghor, advocated close relations with France and negotiation and compromise as the best means of resolving international differences after Senegal's independence from its status as a French colony. To a large extent, the two succeeding presidents, Abdou Diouf and Abdoulaye Wade, have carried on Senghor's policies and philosophies. Senegal has long supported functional integration among French-speaking West African states through the West African Economic and Monetary Union.

Senegal has a high profile in many international organizations and was a member of the UN Security Council in 1988–89. It was elected to the UN Commission on Human Rights in 1997. Friendly to the West, especially to France and to the United States, Senegal also is a vigorous proponent of more assistance from developed countries to the Third World. Additionally, Senegal has been a member state of the African Union since 1963. The present-day Senegalese president, Macky Sall, is currently serving as the African Union's chairperson as of February 5, 2022.

Senegal borders The Gambia, Mauritania, Mali, Guinea, and Guinea-Bissau. Senegal enjoys mostly cordial relations with its neighbors. In spite of clear progress on other fronts with Mauritania (border security, resource management, economic integration, etc.), there remains the problem of an estimated 30,000 Black Mauritanian refugees living in Senegal.

Senegal is also a member of the International Criminal Court with a Bilateral Immunity Agreement of protection for the US-military (as covered under Article 98).

Pre-colonial foreign policy 
Senegal was regarded as Senegambia before the arrival of Europeans (Jaiteh), where a number of independent kingdoms settled. By the 15th century, when the first Europeans arrived, Senegambia was linked to intra and inter-regional (Decourse, 8) trade networks that extended throughout the coast. During the 17th and 18th centuries, the African slave trade took advantage of autonomous kingdoms such as, the Wolof and Jolof kingdoms (Tang, 3). The establishment of French colonies coupled with the competing hegemonic power between local ethnic groups within the Wolof kingdom led to a power void after traditional rulers could not prevent the French from impeding the establishments already in place by politicians and elites (Venema, 4) . The change from slave trade to the trade of cash crops set the precedent for the collapse of states within both empires (Gray, 3). The French used Senegal's advantageous geographic location, on the coast of the Atlantic Ocean, to safeguard their interest in the trade of groundnuts (Schraeder and Gaye, 488). The foreign policy of Senegal is also characterized by the religious values and beliefs of Islam. The spiritual traditions and foundations of Senegal represent another facet of foreign policy in and outside of the region. Political and diplomatic actors are ultimately determined by marabouts that intercede on behalf of the people to Allah (Schraeder and Gaye, 489). Some marabouts establish loyalist relationships of patron with political leaders. Marabouts do not make policy, but their support is essential to the stability of government (Behrman Creevey, 262).

Independence (1960-1989) 
Senegalese independence began in 1960 with Léopold Sedar Sénghor as the first president and was succeeded by Abdou Diouf in 1980. Senegalese diplomats in the Ministry of Foreign Affairs believe that West Africa must unite in order to not only remain competitive in an international economy dominated by superpowers like China and the United States, but also promote and consolidate economic development within West Africa . Senegalese policy officials prioritize and use the individual strengths of surrounding African countries in order to strengthen regional economies and weaken regional dependency on foreign actors. This combative approach for western influence is underscored in the Senegalese constitution in clause four of the preamble: “must spare no effort in the fulfillment of African Unity”. These efforts have been actively pursued through formal diplomatic agreements with neighboring countries, such as the Mali Foundation in 1960, the Federation with Gambia from 1982 to 1989, as well as informal forms of cooperation such as the Inter-State Authority in the Fight Against Drought in the Sahel (CILSS), The Economic Community of West African States (ECOWAS), The Joint African and Malagasy Organization (OCAM), the Organization for the Development of the Gambia River Valley (OMVG), and the Organization for the Development of the Senegal River Valley (OMVS).

Cold War Foreign Policy 
During the Cold War, Senegal was part of the non-aligned world and remained neutral throughout the conflict. In 1965, the first Foreign Minister of Senegal, Doudou Thiam, published a book titled "The Foreign Policy of African States." Thiam implored Africa to move beyond the ideological divisions of the Cold War to form a third neutral ideology on which African states could build their own path. This concept of non-alignment became a central theme in Senegalese politics. Senegal's first President Léopold Sedar Sénghor privileged the country's relationship with France and sided with French President Charles de Gaulle against "superpower" domination between the U.S. and the Soviet Union. France accounted for 95% of all investments in Senegal and 80% of Senegal's foreign trade in the 1960s .  Due to the close economic relationship between France and Senegal, Senegal appealed to French protectionism over West Africa, declining to move too closely to any superpower. Nonetheless, Senegal's ties with Western countries like France tilted its alignment westward.

"La Francophonie" 
One of the important strategic goals of Senegalese leaders was the integration and cooperation of Francophone Africa; a policy known as "la Francophonie" coined by President Senghor. The promotion of this concept played a key role in the formation of worldwide summits, such as the Franco-African Summit, that allowed Senegal to emerge as a leader within the francophone movement in Africa, African consolidation, unification and cooperation are at the center of Senegalese foreign policy. Senegal was also one of the founding members of several organizations designed to integrate Francophone Africa, including the African and Malagasy Common Organization in 1961 and the Malian Federation in 1960.

"Négritude" 
Another cornerstone of Senegalese foreign policy during the Cold War was the exemplification of African Art and international cultural ties. This was connected to President Senghor's ideology of "Negritude" which emphasized Pan-Africanism and the exceptionalism of African culture. In 1966, the First World Festival of Negro Arts was hosted in Dakar, Senegal. The event was a tribute the art and excellence of the African Diaspora across the world. In the development of the event, Senegal strengthened relations with the UN, African states like Ethiopia, and nations on both sides of the Cold War. The United States was one of the key supporters of the event, sending the largest delegation of performers, artists, and technician of any of the 43 participating nations. Despite an official policy of non-alignment, Senegal used African Art and Culture as a negotiation tool with international partners and build a "soft" foreign policy with a variety of nations. At the same time, the First World Festival of Negro Arts was seen by many post-colonial states as neocolonial due to its connection to French concept of Negritude and cooperation with Western powers. The event strained relationships with Algeria and Guinea who would host their own festival in the years following in Algiers.

Iran-Senegal Relations 
Senegal's non-alignment policy also contributed to the building of significant relationships with other nations. President Sénghor developed strong political and economic ties with the Shah of Iran, Mohammad Reza Pahlavi. In 1971, formal diplomatic relations were established, and, by 1973, the Shah was providing $2.4 million in developmental loans for Senegal (Steele 180–1). Iran continued to provide development investment and loans from 1974 to 1979 that focused on the trade of Iranian oil for Senegalese phosphate, including the creation of an oil refinery and a new adjacent city in Senegal (Steele 183–4). The project was never completed due to funding gaps and the Iranian Revolution, despite strong intentions to move forward.

Current Partnerships

U.S.-Senegal Relations 
Diplomatic relations between the United States and Senegal began in 1960, following independence and the dissolution of the Mali Federation. Early after independence, a relationship was formed between President Senghor and U.S. President John F. Kennedy as part of the latter's "African Policy." As part of Senegal's policy of non-alignment and African Socialism, bilateral relations between the two were limited but meaningful. The United States contributed aid to Senegal, including for the First World Festival of Negro Arts, and maintained consistent contact with the country throughout the Cold War via its US Agency for International Development (USAID).

Today, U.S.-Senegal Relations are defined by foreign aid, military cooperation, and the protection of democracy in the region. The United States provides a growing amount of economic aid to the country. Senegal has received aid for democracy promotion, food security, and development projects like $1.5 million in aid for solar energy and nano-loan financing systems. Health diplomacy is another sector of aid that the United States and Senegal collaborate on. These include programs for child health, the prevention of Malaria, and family planning funded by USAID. Recently, the US sent $10.7 million of emergency aid and 99,450 vaccine does to Senegal to combat the COVID-19 pandemic. Defense has also been a major area of partnership as Senegal has remained a stable nation in a region consistently fraught with violence. In 2016, both nations also signed a Defense Cooperation Agreement that would ensure joint-military training and missions in West African states affected by Islamic extremism and alleviate the need for more troops to be stationed in Senegal. Senegal has also supported U.S. military missions in Iraq (1991), Niger (2016), and even its own territory during the Ebola outbreak of 2014, through the auspices of the United States African Command (AFRICOM). Another major priority of the United States in Senegal is the promotion and protection of democracy. Senegal's democratic system has persisted for decades and has become more democratic following the Cold War, garnering the attention of the U.S. as a model state for West Africa. The United States manages several programs or aid packets meant to increase democratic diplomacy. One of these programs is conducted by the United States Information Agency which help hold workshops and training with Senegalese news federation and reporters to increase the independence and power of the press in the country.

The relationship between the United States and Senegal is often limited by the country's strong ties with France, preventing deep connections from forming without diplomatic conflict. The French have been critical of recent "hard" diplomacy actions by the U.S., including AFRICOM and limited the nation's African Crisis Response Initiative (ACRI) to the training of African forces in West Africa.

Intergovernmental Organizations

ECOWAS 
Senegal is a Zone A member of ECOWAS since its formation in 1975 with the signing of the Treaty of Lagos and the largest contributor of troops in the Economic Community of West African States Monitoring Group (ECOMOG). According to the ECOWAS official website, Senegal's affairs in ECOWAS are currently overseen by Madame Aissata Tall Sall, Senegal's Foreign Minister. Senegal holds 6 seats in ECOWAS's Community Parliament, which assigns seats based on member states’ populations.

The Trans-West African Coastal Highway was an ECOWAS project which made significant infrastructure developments that connected Senegals’ Capital, Dakar, to other major cities in the surrounding region, such as Lagos in Nigeria and Nouakchott in Mauritania. Additionally, ECOWAS oversaw the construction of a 1.9 km bridge connecting Senegal to its interior neighbor, the Gambia, and has begun plans to construct a bridge connecting Mauritania and Senegal. Not only did these projects expand Senegal's physical infrastructure and access to its neighbors, but they are projected by officials to be prosperous for economic development through trade expansion.

On July 10, 2014, ECOWAS member states agreed to begin an economic partnership agreement (EPA) with the EU. The implementation of the EPA, along with the adoption of a common external tariff (CET) for ECOWAS members, impacted the Senegalese economy's ability to levy custom tariffs on EU imports, thus reducing revenue collected by the Senegalese government, but increasing remuneration in the formal Senegalese labor market.

Guinea-Bissau Civil War (1998) 
Senegal contributed about 2,000 troops upon the request of President Joao Bernardo Vieira of Guinea-Bissau for support during the Guinea-Bissau Civil War. The contribution of Senegalese troops to the Civil War also served to benefit Senegalese national interests because Vieira's government was at risk of being replaced in a coup attempt by Ansumane Mane. Mane was believed to be sending weapons  to Casamance separatists, who are a secessionist group in the southwestern region of Senegal. In November 1998, Senegal abided by the conclusion of the ECOWAS authority to withdraw Senegalese and Guinean troops from the intervention and instead allow the other ECOWAS nations to contribute armed forces in Guinea-Bissau.

The Gambia (2017) 
ECOWAS militarily intervened in The Gambia in 2017 when Former Gambian President Yahya Jammeh refused to concede after losing the election that year, abbreviated as ECOMIG and code-named “Operation Restore Democracy”. The Senegalese Foreign Minister first brought this concern to the U.N. Security Council in an emergency meeting (UNSC Resolution 2337). The resolution called for a peaceful resolution to the Gambian presidential crisis and passed unanimously; ECOWAS military forces, led by a Senegalese commander, entered the Gambia following the resolution's passage. Senegal's armed forces played an active role in this military intervention and had a vested political interest in Jammeh stepping down; Adama Barrow, the current Gambian president, was sworn into his presidential office in the Gambian embassy in Dakar, Senegal for fear of his safety. Additionally, Jammeh was a cause of concern because his alleged aid to Casamance separatists in Senegal. Conflicts between pro-Jammeh forces and the Senegalese armed forces produced refugee flows into Senegal and Guinea-Bissau.

Mali Federation (1959–60) 
Senegal was an active member of the Mali Federation during its existence from 1959 to 1960. Along with French Sudan, Senegal advocated for the union of French-speaking West African nations, including the proposal of the union's name, and was a key contributor in its creation. The formation of the Federation reflected a desire to prevent AOF (Afrique Occidentale Française, or French West Africa) from fragmenting — the constitution writing process was led by Leopold Senghor and Modibo Keita, the first presidents of Senegal and Mali, respectively.

In 1960, Senegalese and Malian interests conflicted when Senghor became a candidate for the presidency of the Federation and Keita responded by declaring a state of emergency. On August 20, Senegal left the Mali Federation. The Federation subsequently dissolved.

Senegambian Confederation (1981-89) 
The Senegambian Confederation, comprising The Gambia and Senegal, was established in 1981 and dissolved in 1989. The Confederation was intended to promote security, political, and economic unity between the two countries, and in the vision of the Senegalese government, an eventual integration of the countries, to which The Gambia resisted. The Confederation's disestablishment was initiated by the abrupt withdrawal of Senegalese troops from the Gambia, but ultimately was a culmination of multiple factors.

CILSS 
The Comité permanent Inter-États de Lutte contre La Sécheresse dans Le Sahel (CILSS) or the Permanent Interstates Committee for Drought Control in the Sahel is an international organization dedicated to combatting the effects of drought and desertification in the Sahel region of Africa. Founded in 1973 after major droughts across the Sahel, CILSS has worked to uphold the work of ECOWAS in ensuring food and energy security, to educate local engineers on more sustainable development practices, to provide information on ongoing environmental problems, and to research the effects of climate change and desertification. While originally consisting of 13 mostly Francophone West African nations including Senegal, the organization was integrated into ECOWAS, expanding to a total of 17 members.

Senegal is one of the founding members of CILSS and one of its biggest contributors The nation and Senegalese President Macky Sall has been leaders in development projects like "2iS" or the "Sahel Irrigation Initiative" which would create a network of irrigation infrastructure across the Sahel belt to support water-insecure areas.

African and Malagasy Common Organization (1961-1985) 
The African and Malagasy Common Organization or the Organization Commune Africaine et Malgache (OCAM) was an international organization that encompassed much of Francophone West and Central Africa and Madagascar from 1961 to 1985. It was originally established as the Union Africaine et Malgache in 1961, with the support of France, for the purpose of greater economic, political, and social integration of French-speaking West Africa. At its height from 1961 to 1973, the organization included 14-15 members and changed names several times before finally settling on the African, Malagasy, and Mauritian Common Organization (OCAMM). After 1973, member states began to leave the organization because of the lack of substantive work and integration of its governing bodies, especially following the establishment of the Organization of African Unity (later the African Union) in 1963 which had a broader Pan-African focus and mandate.

Senegal was a member of OCAM from its founding to its eventual dissolution in 1985 and was instrumental in its development. President Senghor, in particular, was a major supporter of the organization because of his policy of " la Francophonie" or the integration of French-speaking Africa. Senegal remains a member of several of the institutions that were initially created by the Conference of Heads of State while OCAM was still functional, including the African and Malagasy Council on Higher Education (CAMES).

OMVG 
Senegal is one of the two founding members of the Organization pour la Mise en Valeur de la Fleuve Gambie (OMVG), also known as the Organization for the Development of the Gambia River Basin. Its other members include Gambia, Guinea-Bissau, and Guinea. The objective of the organization is to ensure the proper management and shared usage of water resources in the Gambia and Geba River Basins across the borders of member states. The OMVG has become increasingly important in recent years due to climate change and conflicts between Senegal and Guinea-Bissau over water resources in the Geba river. One of its main projects is the usage of the river basin for hydro-electrification. Particularly in Southern Senegalese region of Kédougou, the planned construction of Sambangalou Hydroelectric Development (AHES) on the border of Guinea would provide power and greater agriculture potential to the area.

OMVS 
The Organization pour la Mise en Valeur de la Fleuve Sénégal (OMVS) or the Organization for the Development of the Senegal River Basin was established in 1972 and consists of four member states: Senegal, Guinea, Mali, and Mauritania. Former Senegalese President Senghor is considered one of the "founding fathers" of the organization. The goals of the OMVS are to promote the economic integration, development, and sustainability of the river basin which provides essential natural resources to member states. Dakar, the capital of Senegal, relies on the Senegal river for 75% of its water usage.

The OMVS has been an effective organization at developing the Senegal River Basin, but have experienced diplomatic and environmental problems throughout its existence. The most serious of these conflicts was between Senegal and Mauritania. In the late-1980s and early-1990s, there were a series of violent clashes between Senegalese farmers and Mauritanian herders over scarce resources near the river. After the murder and expulsion of Senegalese farmers from Mauritania, troops from both countries were mobilized to the border and over 100 Mauritanians were killed in Dakar while the rest were expelled. The only remaining Mauritanians in Senegal were diplomats working for the OMVS which remained the only diplomatic relationship between Senegal and Mauritania at the time. This period almost saw the two countries go to war and cemented current tensions within the organization despite continuing plans for development and research.

Future developments in foreign policy 
Senegal is regarded on the international stage as one of the most stable democracies in Africa (Konte) as a result of three peaceful power-transitions since 1960 (WorldBank). Senegalese policy making is primarily based on immediate neighbors, the remainder of Africa, the Arab world and other Muslim states, and western democracies (Schraeder and Gaye, 501) and revolves around Mauritania, Mali, Guinea, Guinea-Bissau, and Gambia (Schraeder and Gaye, 502). A source of conflict between Senegal and surrounding nations has been the management and development of shared border resources (Schraeder and Gaye, 503).

Senegalese foreign policy also revolves around Senegal's involvement in the internal affairs of other African nations and the desire to take and establish a lead role in a myriad of organizations committed to promoting regional integration and African unity (Schraeder and Gaye, 504). International commitments are a distinctive aspect of Senegalese foreign policy and includes arrangements with international organizations that operate in Senegal and members of state organizations that Senegal belongs to (Sall, 9). An obligatory resolution mandated by the United Nations or a decree by the Economic Community of West African States (ECOWAS) may constitute an international commitment by Senegal.

Senegalese foreign policy is now characterized by a nationalism that is fueled by the place Senegal once had within the French colony and a traditional culture. Thus, constituting a sense of regional superiority in regards to the domain of regional integration. The thirty-five years of uninterrupted democratic rule in Senegal has also been a key factor in Senegalese foreign policy. Over seventy percent of people are dependent on agriculture to provide economic stability and most of Senegal's economic earnings stem from the exportation of groundnuts (Gray, 1). Thus, Senegal is currently working towards a structural transformation of their economy by implementing a form of economic diplomacy to strengthen regional stability and seize foreign markets (Zacchia et al., 2). Senegal plays an active role within international organizations such as the United Nations Security Council,  Economic Community of West African States (ECOWAS), Nepad, and the Organisation of Islamic Cooperation or the International Organisation of La Francophonie (WorldBank).

Bilateral relations

Africa

Americas

Asia

Europe

Disputes – international
A short section of the boundary with the Gambia is undefined.

See also
 List of diplomatic missions in Senegal
 List of diplomatic missions of Senegal
 Senegambia Confederation

References